Jan-Erik Fjell (born 1982), is a Norwegian novelist.

He was born in Fredrikstad. He made his literary debut with the novel Pus in 2009. His crime novel Tysteren, with detective "Anton Brekke", was awarded the Norwegian Booksellers' Prize for 2010. Further crime novels are Skyggerom (2012), Hevneren (2013), Rovdyret (2014) and Lykkejegeren (2016).

References

1982 births
Living people
People from Fredrikstad
Norwegian male novelists
Norwegian crime fiction writers
21st-century Norwegian novelists
21st-century Norwegian male writers